William of Berg may refer to:

William I of Berg ( 1242–1308), son of Count Adolf VII of Berg and Margaret of Hochstaden
William IV, Duke of Jülich-Berg (1455–1511),  last ruler of the Duchy of Jülich-Berg
William, Duke of Jülich-Cleves-Berg (1516–1592)
William VII of Jülich, 1st Duke of Berg (1348–1408), son of Gerhard VI of Jülich, Count of Berg 
William IV of Berg-s'Heerenberg (1537–1586),  Stadtholder of Guelders and Zutphen

See also
William Berg (disambiguation)